The Willoughbys is a 2020 computer-animated comedy film directed by Kris Pearn and co-directed by Rob Lodermeier. Based on the book of the same name by Lois Lowry, the film's screenplay was written by Pearn and Mark Stanleigh, and stars the voices of Will Forte, Maya Rudolph, Alessia Cara, Terry Crews, Martin Short, Jane Krakowski, Seán Cullen, and Ricky Gervais, who also narrates the film and follows four kids (including the twins) trying to find new parents to replace their self-centered and neglectful ones.

The Willoughbys was released on April 22, 2020, with 37 million people viewing the movie. It received positive reviews for its animation, acting, story, and soundtrack by Mark Mothersbaugh, as well as Cara's song, "I Choose". It has received six Annie Award nominations, including Best Animated Feature.

Plot
A cat narrates the story of the Willoughby siblings: Tim, Jane, and twins both named Barnaby. The Willoughby family legacy has an accomplished history, but the children's parents only care about each other. They despise all children and deprive the siblings of love, food, and music. Tim longs for his family's past glory and unity.

Jane discovers an orphaned baby on the family's doorstep. She brings the baby inside despite Tim's warnings, and the baby wreaks havoc. The Willoughby parents throw their children out of the house, forbidding them to return unless they get rid of the baby. The children follow a rainbow to the doorstep of Commander Melanoff's candy factory, and believing it to be a suitable home, name the baby "Ruth" and leave her there. On their way home, the siblings hatch a plan to improve their lives by getting rid of their parents. The siblings put together a vacation brochure full of deadly destinations that could potentially kill their parents.

Their parents are excited by the brochure and leave immediately. Tim tries to take care of his siblings alone, but flounders until the nanny hired by their parents arrives. The nanny, Linda, proves to be much warmer and more caring than their parents, and Jane and the Barnabys warm up to her almost immediately; Tim, however, remains distrustful. When Linda learns about Ruth, she rushes to the candy factory with the children in tow. Melanoff explains that he originally intended to hand the baby over to the Department of Orphan Services, but grew attached to her; Linda is assured that Ruth will be well cared for in the factory.

Meanwhile, the Willoughby parents have somehow survived several hazardous destinations, but soon discover they're out of money. Unwilling to return home, they decide to sell their house in order to further finance their vacation. They tell Linda by voice message, and Linda assures them she will take care of the children. Tim steals Linda's cell phone and finds the voice messages. He mistakenly assumes Linda means to dispose of the children, and secretly calls Orphan Services to report her.

The Willoughby parents hire a realtor to sell the house to potential buyers, but the children scare off all but one family. Linda scares the last family off for them. Tim finally realizes how much Linda cares. However, Orphan Services arrive in response to Tim's call. Heartbroken by Tim's betrayal, Linda leaves in tears, and the Willoughby siblings are forcibly taken away and placed in separate foster homes until their parents' return. Tim repeatedly runs away from his well-meaning foster families and runs to the Willoughby home just in time to watch its demolition. Orphan Services decides to detain him in a cell at their Headquarters.

The narrator cat finally intervenes by giving Tim's helmet to Linda. She decides to reunite the children. Disguised as a janitor, Linda sneaks into Tim's cell, reconciles with him, and breaks him out with Orphan Services in pursuit. Linda then retrieves and reunites the other Willoughby children.

The children decide to go back to their parents so Orphan Services will leave them alone. With the help of Linda, Ruth, and Melanoff, the Willoughbys build a dirigible to rescue them from the "Unclimbable Alps" in Sveetzerlünd, a parody of Switzerland, which is the final and deadliest destination on their parents' trip. The siblings decide to take the dirigible and leave the adults and Ruth behind. As they reach their destination, they follow a trail of their mother's yarn to the top of the mountain, where they find their parents nearly frozen to death. The siblings and the cat save them. The children confess that they sent them away but hope to reunite as a family. However, their parents are selfish as always, stealing the dirigible and abandoning the children. However, not knowing how to steer the dirigible, Mr. and Mrs. Willoughby crash into the ocean.

With no way off the mountain, the siblings start to freeze to death, with no way down back, Jane sings for them. Thankfully, Ruth, Melanoff and Linda followed the dirigible and heard Jane's song, finding the siblings just in time. Now officially orphans, the Willoughbys are adopted by Linda and Melanoff, living much happier lives together with Ruth and the Cat at Melanoff's candy factory. Meanwhile, Mr. and Mrs. Willoughby are shown to have survived the dirigible crash and are stranded at sea, whereupon they are eaten by a shark.

Voice cast 
 Will Forte as Tim Willoughby, the  protagonist of the film, he is the oldest and rational son of the Willoughbys. 
 Maya Rudolph as Linda a.k.a. The Nanny, an eccentric babysitter who looks after the kids. She is also revealed to be an orphan-herself.
 Alessia Cara as Jane Willoughby, the cheerful middle child of the Willoughbys with a passion for singing.
 Terry Crews as Commander Melanoff, the joyous, but lonely owner of a candy factory.
 Martin Short as Walter "Father" Willoughby, the Willoughby's abusive father with a hobby of ships in bottles.
 Jane Krakowski as Helga "Mother" Willoughby, the Willoughby's abusive mother with a hobby of knitting.
 Seán Cullen as Barnaby A and Barnaby B Willoughby, the "creepy" twin boys and youngest children of the Willoughbys with a shared passion for inventing. 
 Ricky Gervais as The Cat, a talking blue tabby cat, and the narrator of the film.
 Colleen Wheeler as Orphan Service Agent Alice Vernakov. 
 Nancy Robertson as Irene Holmes. 
 Kris Pearn as Spoons McGee.

Production 
In November 2015, Bron Studios acquired the animated film rights to Lois Lowry's book The Willoughbys, and hired Kris Pearn to adapt it into a screenplay with Adam Wood to direct the film, with Aaron L. Gilbert and Luke Carroll producing. In April 2017, Ricky Gervais was cast in the film to play the narrator as well as one of the characters and it was reported that Pearn would co-direct the film with Cory Evans. The screenplay however was replaced by Pearn and Mark Stanleigh with a story by Pearn who also executive produced the film. In June 2017, the cast was expanded to include, Terry Crews, Maya Rudolph, Martin Short, Jane Krakowski, and Seán Cullen. Will Forte and Alessia Cara (in her film debut) also provided their voices, with Netflix set to distribute the film.

The film was produced at the Bron Animation studio in Burnaby, British Columbia. The characters in the film were designed by character designer Craig Kellman, who designed characters for DreamWorks Animation’s Madagascar and Sony Pictures Animation’s Hotel Transylvania, as well as Metro-Goldwyn-Mayer’s The Addams Family.

The music in the film was composed and conducted by Mark Mothersbaugh, who previously worked with Pearn on Cloudy with a Chance of Meatballs 2. The original song "I Choose" (performed by Alessia Cara, who plays the voice of Jane in the film) was released independently by Def Jam Recordings.

Release
The film was digitally released on April 22, 2020, by Netflix. It was viewed at least in-part by 37 million households over its first month of release.

Reception

Critical response 
The site's critical consensus reads: "An appealing animated adventure whose silliness is anchored in genuine emotion, The Willoughbys offers fanciful fun the entire family can enjoy." On Metacritic the film has a weighted average score of 68 out of 100, based on 14 critics, indicating a "generally favorable reviews".

Renee Schonfeld of Common Sense Media, gave the film four stars out of five, noting that the film is a "wonderfully whimsical tale with dark themes [that] is softened by warmth, humor, and stellar performances by talented comic actors who brighten the already inventive and luminous animation." The Hollywood Reporter'''s David Rooney said that "the Netflix animated family comedy-adventure has an oddball charm that works surprisingly well." Natalia Winkelman of The New York Times'' said that the film "is charming on a moment-to-moment basis. Running gags, like how the nanny triggers a car pileup whenever she crosses the street, help to round out an unruly world. The composer Mark Mothersbaugh contributes a jazzy score and original song (performed by Cara) that punctuate the giddy mood. Though it tends to feel disjointed as a whole, 'The Willoughbys' thrives when it embraces its grim plot and lets mischief reign."

Accolades

References

External links 
 

American computer-animated films
Canadian computer-animated films
Canadian black comedy films
2020 black comedy films
2020 computer-animated films
2020 films
Animated films based on novels
Animated films set in New York City
Bron Studios films
Netflix Animation films
American black comedy films
Films directed by Kris Pearn
Films scored by Mark Mothersbaugh
Films set in Scotland
Films set in Switzerland
Films about orphans
American children's animated comedy films
Films about dysfunctional families
2020s English-language films
2020s Canadian films
2020s American films